Adrien Thomasson (born 10 December 1993) is a French professional footballer who plays as a midfielder for Ligue 1 club Lens.

Career
Born in Savoie, Thomasson began playing youth football with local Evian before turning professional with the club's senior side. He plays as a central midfielder, but played on the left flank, notably while on loan at Vannes.

In June 2018, Thomasson joined Strasbourg on a three-year contract.

On 12 January 2023, Thomasson signed for Lens on a three-and-a-half year contract. On 23 January 2023, he played his first game and scored his first goal with Lens during a Coupe de France match against Brest. For his second game with Lens on 28 January, he scored his second goal against Troyes.

Personal life
Thomasson was born in France to a French father of Swedish descent and a Croatian mother.

Career statistics

Honours
Strasbourg
Coupe de la Ligue: 2018–19

References

External links

Adrien Thomasson foot-national.com Profile

1993 births
Living people
Association football defenders
French footballers
French people of Swedish descent
French people of Croatian descent
Thonon Evian Grand Genève F.C. players
Vannes OC players
FC Nantes players
RC Strasbourg Alsace players
RC Lens players
Ligue 1 players
Championnat National 3 players
Championnat National players
People from Bourg-Saint-Maurice
Sportspeople from Savoie
Footballers from Auvergne-Rhône-Alpes